The State Council is an advisory body to the Russian head of state, which deals with issues of the highest importance to the state as a whole. The council was established by a decree of the President of Russia, Vladimir Putin, on September 1, 2000.

History 
The current State Council is the third in the history of Russia. It is the successor to the State Council under the President of the RSFSR (1991) and the Imperial State Council (1810—1917).

The President signed the decree forming the State Council on the basis of articles 80 and 85 of the Constitution and the newly passed Federal Law “On the Procedure for Forming the Federation Council of the Federal Assembly of the Russian Federation.”
The President formed the State Council in order to harness the potential of regional leaders. In doing so, he took into account the requests and proposals of the Federation Council, the upper house of the Russian parliament members and State Duma deputies.

In its capacity as an advisory body, the State Council aids the President in discharging his duties to ensure the concerted functioning and interaction of various governmental bodies.
The Chairman of the State Council is the President of Russia. Upon his order, the acting Secretary of the State Council is currently one of the aides to the President, Alexander S. Abramov.

The Presidential Domestic Affairs Directorate is responsible for the administrative support of the State Council.

The Council is made up of the leaders (governors and presidents) of Russia’s Federal Subjects. Other persons may be appointed to the Council at the President’s discretion.

On September 2, 2000, Putin established the Presidium of the State Council, whose task is to prepare for State Council sessions. The Presidium comprises the leaders of seven constituent territories representing each of the seven federal districts. Members of the Presidium rotate every six months, as envisaged by the regulations of the State Council and the Presidential Decree on the Council’s Presidium.

The State Council considers issues of particular importance to the state, such as the development of governmental institutions, economic and social reforms and other objects affecting the public as a whole. The sessions are the principal medium for the work of the State Council and are held four times a year without a rigid timetable. Each session focuses on a single issue. 
On the eve of a session of the State Council, the Presidium meets to discuss the following day’s issue.

It has also become accepted practice to discuss some issues at joint sessions of the State Council’s Presidium and the Security Council, sometimes with the participation of other presidential advisory bodies.

See also
State Council of Imperial Russia

References

Government of Russia
2000 establishments in Russia